The 1931 Hamburg state election was held on 27 September 1931 to elect the 160 members of the Hamburg Parliament.

Results

References 

1931 elections in Germany
1931
September 1931 events